Dillane is a surname. Notable people with the surname include:

Frank Dillane (born 1991), British actor, son of Stephen
Richard Dillane (born 1964), British actor
Stephen Dillane (born 1957), British actor
Ultan Dillane (born 1993), Irish rugby union player